Pete Muller is an American businessman, singer-songwriter, and philanthropist.

Muller is a hedge fund manager and quantitative trader who founded PDT Partners in 1993 as part of Morgan Stanley's trading division, which spun out as an independent business in 2012. He was described by Bloomberg.com as an "unlikely executive", a math wizard, and a person with diverse intellectual interests and hobbies.

As a singer-songwriter, Muller recorded and released four studio albums. His original song, "San Diego (When You Coming Home)", reached No. 27 on the Billboard Adult Contemporary Chart in March 2020. In September of that same year, his single "God and Democracy" also reached the Billboard Adult Contemporary Top 30.

Early life and education
Muller was raised in Wayne, New Jersey with his sister. His parents were both immigrants to the United States; his Austrian-born father was an engineer and his mother, a native of Brazil, was a practicing psychiatrist.

Muller graduated in mathematics with honors from Princeton University, where he also played Ultimate Frisbee and was a member of the Colonial Club.

Business career
Muller began his career working at Barra Inc., a financial analytics firm in Berkeley, California. He joined Morgan Stanley in 1992.

Muller founded PDT (Process Driven Trading) Partners inside Morgan Stanley in 1993 and serves as Founder and CEO. PDT has offices in New York City and London and has returned 20% on average annually through 2010. PDT was spun out of Morgan Stanley in 2013 and as of 2019, had over $6 billion in assets under management. In 2019, Forbes reported that Muller earned around $150 million in the previous year, making its list of the highest-earning hedge fund managers for 2018.

Musical career
A singer-songwriter and pianist, Muller tours regularly and has made appearances at music events such as Montreux Jazz Festival in Switzerland, the Jazz Open in Stuttgart, Germany, and the Telluride Jazz Festival. In the early stages of his music career, Muller played the electronic keyboard in New York City Subway.

In 2019, Muller released his fourth studio album, Dissolve, produced by renowned Rob Mathes. It was featured in American Songwriter and People magazine. "San Diego (When You Coming Home)", from that album, reached No. 27 on the Billboard Adult Contemporary Chart. His single "God and Democracy" was a Top 30 hit on the Billboard Adult Contemporary Chart in the Summer of 2020.

Philanthropy
Muller's main philanthropic interests are music, math, and the environment. He is a founding board member of Math for America and a Berklee College of Music Trustee. In September 2017, with the support of the New York City Mayor's Office of Media and Entertainment and the Economic Development Corporation, Muller with Berklee acquired Avatar Studios, also known as The Power Station, which gained renown as one of the finest acoustic environments for recording in the world.

Personal life
Muller is married to his wife Jillian and together they have two children.
He writes crossword puzzles for the New York Times periodically and has a monthly feature in The Washington Post . In 1998, Muller made the final table of the $3,000 Limit Hold 'em event at the World Series of Poker and came in 4th at the World Poker Challenge. He also practices vinyasa yoga, snowboards, and surfs.

References

American hedge fund managers
Living people
People from Wayne, New Jersey
Wayne Valley High School alumni
Princeton University alumni
American singer-songwriters
Year of birth missing (living people)